Drosero (before 1927: Κονούφι - Konoufi, between 1927 and 1955: Έλος - Elos) is a small town located in the Ptolemaida municipal unit, northern Kozani regional unit, itself in the Greek region of Macedonia.

References

Populated places in Kozani (regional unit)